Italy competed at the 1980 European Athletics Indoor Championships in Sindelfingen, West Germany, from 1 to 2 March 1980.

Medalists

Top eight
Six Italian athletes reached the top eight in this edition of the championships.
Men

Women

See also
 Italy national athletics team

References

External links
 EAA official site 

1980
1980 European Athletics Indoor Championships
1980 in Italian sport